Raymond Lamont-Brown (born 1939) is a Scottish non-fiction writer of biographies and popular history books. He is the former editor of Writers' Monthly.

Selected publications

Articles
 "YAKUSA the International Expansion of Japan's Criminal Brotherhood", The Police Journal: Theory, Practice and Principles, Vol. 55, No. 4 (1 October 1982), pp. 355–359.

Books
 A book of epitaphs (1967)
 Clarinda: The intimate story of Robert Burns and Agnes MacLehose (1968)
 A book of proverbs (1970)
 A book of superstitions (1970)
 Phantoms of the sea: Legends, customs, and superstitions (1972)
 Phantoms of the theater (1976)
 Growing up with the Highland clans (1978)
 Kamikaze: Japan's suicide samurai (1997)
 Edward VII's last loves: Alice Keppel & Agnes Keyser (1998)
 Kempeitai: Japan's dreaded military police (1998)
 Tutor to the Dragon Emperor: The life of Sir Reginald Fleming Johnston at the court of the last emperor (1999)
 John Brown: Queen Victoria's Highland servant (2000)
 Royal poxes and potions: The lives of court physicians, surgeons and apothecaries (2001)
 Ships from hell: Japanese war crimes on the high seas (2002)
 Carnegie: The richest man in the world (2005) 
 How fat was Henry VIII?: And 101 other questions and answers on royal history (2008)

References 

Living people
1939 births
Scottish justices of the peace
Scottish non-fiction writers
Scottish educators
Scottish broadcasters
Scottish biographers